Rietumu is a Latvian private commercial bank founded in 1992.

The bank specializes in providing financial services to businesses and private individuals. Rietumu is one of the largest private banks in the Baltics and the largest local capital bank in Latvia. The bank’s headquarters, Rietumu Capital Centre, is located in Riga.

Brief overview 
For many years, Rietumu has been one of the leading Latvian banks and it is the fifth largest Latvian bank in terms of assets. 

Traditionally, an important part of Rietumu Bank's activities was related to foreign markets; however, since 2018 the bank has been focusing on operations in Latvia, the other Baltic countries and the EU. 

In 2018, requirements regarding customer risk assessment were altered significantly in Latvia. Rietumu decided to terminate relationship with customers posing excessively high risk and to transform its business model. The bank’s efforts were highly appreciated by Latvia’s minister of finance and representatives of the U.S. Department of the Treasury.

Currently the main activity of Rietumu is providing services to companies, including implementation of individual loan and investment projects. The bank facilitates expansion of Latvian and Baltic companies into new markets, finances projects in the industrial sector, commercial and residential real estate, cooperates with fintech companies and supports the green economy. The bank continues to provide services, including wealth management services, to wealthy individuals.

History 
1992 – 1999

Establishment and commencement of activities

Rietumu Bank was established in 1992 and registered in the Register of Enterprises of the Republic of Latvia.

In 1995, it became the fifth Latvian bank in terms of assets. In the same year, it started developing its regional information centre network in the cities of the CIS and the Baltic region. In 1996, Rietumu Bank started offering its customers various trust programs that later played an important role in the bank's development strategy. In 1997, Michael Bourke became the President of Rietumu Bank, after having worked within the framework of Phare consulting programme under the President of the Bank of Latvia.   In 1998, the bank opened a range of new branches and continued developing the Corporate Banking, which in 1999, allowed Rietumu Bank to become the leading corporate service provider in Latvia. In 1999, Rietumu Bank started accepting deposits in Euro.

2000 – 2008

Years of growth

In 2001, Rietumu Bank purchased 100% of Saules Banka shares and entered top five Latvian commercial banks. In late 2001 and in 2002, Rietumu Bank issued new, exclusive credit cards Eurocard/MasterCard Platinum and VISA Platinum. In 2003, corporate lending became one of the bank's priority development areas. In 2004, the bank issued VISA chipcards and completely transferred to a unified account numbering system in the EU member states - IBAN (International Bank Account Number). Rietumu Bank purchased Russian broker company Eco Save and established a new investment company RB Investments.

In 2005, 33% of shares were bought by Dermot Desmond, a citizen of Ireland. The bank started building a new central office Rietumu Capital Centre and also issued MasterCard and Maestro chipcards and offered customers a new modern platform for stock exchange transactions in world currencies FOREX. In 2006, the bank was granted a syndicated credit totalling to €60M arranged for by ERAB and a syndicated commercial credit totalling to €110M from more than 20 banks from all over the world. Aleksandrs Kalinovskis became the President of the bank. In 2007, it opened a representative office in Bucharest and extended its accreditation of a representative office in Minsk. The bank was granted one more syndicated commercial credit totalling €120M for three years (with 19 banks from all over the world among the syndicate members).

In 2008, the bank expanded its activities in the CIS countries, having become a co-owner of WestLeasing group of companies in Russia and Belarus and co-owner of Ukrainian Ощадна компанiя broker company. The bank's subsidiary RB Asset Management started offering asset management services: private investment funds, international investment fund portfolios and structured notes. The bank's new central office Rietumu Capital Centre was opened.

2009 – 2017

Development after the crisis and the 25th anniversary

In 2009, Rietumu Bank was the only Latvian bank that gained profit in the circumstances of financial crisis.  Rietumu Bank introduced a new customer identification system Rietumu ID, expanded personal management service to all customers, offering various market financing options, flexible investment opportunities, purchase of gold bars and coins, investment products.  The bank's logo and corporate style were changed.

In 2010, Rietumu Bank offered customers a support programme for obtaining a temporary residence permit in Latvia, which gave an opportunity to move within the Schengen Area. Aleksandr Pankov became Rietumu bank's president. A Hong Kong businessman Balram Chainrai became a holder of 5% share in Rietumu Bank.

In 2011, Rietumu Bank opened a representative office in the capital of Armenia Yerevan, starting to offer its corporate customers a full range of electronic commercial services, Internet acquiring services to its corporate customers based on its European license. It expanded its lending geography in Russia and other CIS countries and rendered support to its customers in European fund raising and started offering a new service - Art-banking.

In 2012, Rietumu Bank opened the bank's partner representative office in Shanghai. The first international e-commerce conference eCom21 was conducted in Riga under the Bank's auspices, attracting more than 250 market professionals from Russia and other CIS countries, Europe and the US.

In 2013, Rietumu Bank presented a new Platinum class credit card Jūrmala. In 2014, Rietumu Bank implemented a virtual ID system, offering a simple and safe identification to its customers who work with the bank from mobile devices with the use of an inbuilt Digipass for Mobile©. The bank completed a limited issue of preference shares and paid up 13.3 mn preference shares.

In 2015, Rietumu Bank made a special smart phone application, giving the bank's customers convenient remote access to their accounts, created a new internet bank website iRietumu for devices with Android platform (internet bank website iRietumu is available to Apple Watch users as well), got the 1st level PCI-DSS certificate that evidences maximum safety of holder's data.

In 2016, the bank offered an opportunity to automatically and safely access structured data on investment portfolios with the use of JSON API — Rietumu Broker Link. This opportunity includes receipt of information on positions, financial instrument flow on accounts and statements. Rietumu Asset Management (RAM) stepped in with new investment products, including investment portfolios Industry 4.0 and major investors’ individual bond portfolio Target Maturity Bonds.

In 2017, Rietumu Bank celebrated the 25th anniversary of its activities. Simultaneously, the bank started its cooperation with the German leading deposit placement platform ZINSPILOT; thus, gaining access to the German savings market, the largest in Europe. Rietumu Bank became the first Latvian bank to start its own project in the fintech area. Moreover, the bank started cooperation with StartinLV association that unites tens of prospective Latvian startups.

2018

New business areas

In the Spring of 2018 the Latvian financial industry was considerably shaken as the US Treasury Department blamed Latvian ABLV Bank for money laundering. Corruption scandal at the level of financial market supervision institution added to this turmoil. As a result of this instability, the Latvian financial market supervision institutions and legislators adopted a range of decisions that considerably restricted banks’ cooperation with non-resident customers, especially high risk clients. At this point, Rietumu Bank made a decision to considerably change its business model, focusing its activities on servicing Latvian customers and customers from other Baltic and OECD states. As part of transformation of this business model, Rietumu Bank terminated cooperation with nearly 4000 high-risk customers. This work was highly assessed by both Latvian supervisory bodies and foreign partners.

At this point the bank's management was changed as well, and the responsibility for the implementation of the new business model was vested in Rolf Fuls, an experienced representative of Rietumu Bank management.

The main regions for the bank's activities are now becoming the Baltics and other EU countries. Rietumu Bank continues focusing on the servicing of corporate clients and affluent individuals. One of the focuses of the new strategy is business lending, which already brings positive results within a short period.

Rietumu Bank was included into the TOP 101 of the most highly assessed Latvian companies – the annual research of the market value of undertakings conducted by the financial company Prudentia in cooperation with Nasdaq Riga stock exchange.

Rietumu Bank sponsored the Latvian national team at the Ice Hockey World Championship, where our team reached the quarter-finals.

Shareholders, council and board 
In the end of 2017, Rietumu Bank's major shareholders were Boswell International Consulting Limited (33.11%, the sole shareholder Dermot Desmond); SIA Esterkin Family Investments (33.12%, the sole shareholder Leonid Esterkin), SIA Suharenko Family Investments (17.34%, the sole shareholder Arkady Suharenko). The bank's Council includes Leonid Esterkin (Chairman), Arkady Suharenko, Brendan Murphy, Dermot Desmond and Valentin Bluger.

Since 2021, the chairman of the Board is Elena Buraya. Before that she led the corporate finance and investment directions of the bank as well as its legal function and also managed the Rietumu group companies. Jelena Buraja is included in the Forbes magazine Top-100 of business ladies of Latvia.

Other member of the Rietumu Bank Board are Ruslan Stecyuk (Deputy Chairman of the Board), Mihail Birzgals and Vladlen Topchiyan.

Performance 
Perfomance:

The bank presents its financial results as a collective "Group". The companies within the Group receive their financing from the Bank, either through loans or capital investments. The Bank typically owns all of the shares of its subsidiaries, meaning it has full ownership and control over them.

Profitability:

In 2021, the Group's net income attributable to equity holders of the Bank rose to EUR 27 million from EUR 10 million in 2020. In 2021, the Group's operating income increased to EUR 82 million, up from EUR 69 million in 2020. This represents a significant increase in profitability, with the Group achieving an after-tax return on equity of 8.41% (2021) vs 3.59% (2020).   

Financial Statements:

As of December 31, 2021, the Group's total assets amounted to EUR 1.5 billion. The Group adopts a conservative approach to asset allocation, with approximately 45% of its assets invested in liquidity management portfolios. The bond portfolio is primarily composed of investment-grade securities issued by corporations, reflecting the Group's commitment to maintaining a high standard of credit quality in its investment strategy.

Group's Liabilities for accounts and deposits account for EUR 1 billion.

As of December 31, 2021, the total shareholders' equity of the Group amounted to EUR 355 million.

Controversial events 
In 2017, a first-instance court in Paris ruled that Rietumu Bank had to pay a EUR 80 million fine as part of proceedings initiated earlier against the French company France Offshore over tax evasion. The bank filed an appeal and in 2021 the Court of Appeal largely reversed the first-instance court's decision in favour of the bank. The international press called this decision of the court a victory for Rietumu.

The Court of Appeal reduced the fine to EUR 20 million. Rietumu commented that it was not guilty and was prepared to defend its position “using the opportunities provided by the EU legal system.” The bank also said that it had well in advance made provisions for potential penalties.

Another controversial development occurred in 2018 when, during a campaign for an “overhaul of the financial system of Latvia”, Rietumu blocked some clients’ accounts and eventually terminated cooperation with these clients by closing their accounts.

References 

Banks of Latvia
Banks established in 1992
Companies based in Riga
Latvian companies established in 1992